William Douglas Long (born February 29, 1960) is a former American professional baseball pitcher who played from 1985 to 1991 for the Chicago White Sox (1985–1990), Chicago Cubs (1990) and Montreal Expos (1991).

Early life
Long was born in Cincinnati, Ohio, and graduated from Moeller High School. He played college football at Miami University in Oxford, Ohio.

Professional career
Long was drafted by the San Diego Padres in the 2nd round of the 1981 MLB amateur draft. Before the 1985 season, Long was traded by the San Diego Padres, along with Ozzie Guillén, Luis Salazar and Tim Lollar, to the White Sox, in the same deal that brought Cy Young Award winner LaMarr Hoyt to San Diego. Long played his first professional game on July 21, 1985, with the Chicago White Sox. In a six-season career, Long posted a 27-27 record with a 4.37 ERA and nine saves in 159 games pitched, 52 as a starter. According to Long, he also played in Caracas, Venezuela. While Long played in Venezuela, he played for the Leones del Caracas, and the Cardenales de Lara.He batted and threw right-handed.

Best season
: Led American League pitchers with a 1.49 W/9IP (28 walks in 169.0 innings pitched)

Life after MLB
Long is currently a teacher at Gray Middle School in Union, Kentucky, where he teaches sixth grade social studies. He is married to Margaret Phelan-Long. He has a son, Marshall.

See also
 Montreal Expos all-time roster
 Chicago White Sox all-time roster

References

External links
Baseball Almanac
Baseball Gauge
Baseball Library
Baseball Reference
Baseball Reference (Minors)
Retrosheet
SportsPool.com
Venezuelan Professional Baseball League

1960 births
Living people
Amarillo Gold Sox players
American expatriate baseball players in Canada
Baseball players from Cincinnati
Beaumont Golden Gators players
Buffalo Bisons (minor league) players
Cardenales de Lara players
Chicago Cubs players
Chicago White Sox players
Hawaii Islanders players
Indianapolis Indians players
Las Vegas Stars (baseball) players
Leones del Caracas players
American expatriate baseball players in Venezuela
Major League Baseball pitchers
Miami RedHawks baseball players
Peninsula Oilers players
Montreal Expos players
Salem Redbirds players
Vancouver Canadians players